Elections to the French National Assembly were held Guinea on 2 January 1956, as part of the wider French elections. The Democratic Party of Guinea – African Democratic Rally won two of the three seats (taken by Ahmed Sékou Touré and Saifoulaye Diallo) with the African Bloc of Guinea winning the other seat (Barry Diawadou).

Results

References

Elections in Guinea
Guinea
1956 in Guinea
1956 elections in France